Pan Hui is a computer scientist at the University of Helsinki and The Hong Kong University of Science and Technology. He was elected as an International Fellow of the Royal Academy of Engineering (FREng) in 2020, a Fellow of the Institute of Electrical and Electronics Engineers (FIEEE), a Member of the Academia Europaea (MAE), and a Distinguished Scientist of the Association for Computing Machinery (ACM). He has been elected to the endowed professorship Nokia Chair in Data Science.

Research 
Professor Hui, as a Chair Professor of Computational Media and Arts (CMA) Thrust, at HKUST-GZ Campus, is recognized as a foundational researcher in the field of networking and communications, especially in the area of mobile computing and networking. His work spans a wide spectrum from foundational work on mobility characterization and networking approaches, to the design and development of software systems, to conceptualization and deployment of innovative applications. With the envision of a perceived virtual universe that is rich in 'Surreality', he has been leading the cutting-edge research on Metaverse, making global impact on shaping the future of Metaverse development.

Opportunistic Networking
Professor Hui has extensively contributed to the foundation of opportunistic networking. His contributions include empirical measurements, mobility modeling, bridging mobile networks with social networks, and innovative applications. He has been considered as a pioneer in bridging the mobile and social networks research fields. His most influential work, related to opportunistic networking, exploited natural characteristics and variations arising in social interactions to provide opportunistic communication without the need for end-to-end connections. Through extensive publications on this topic, Prof. Hui has laid the foundation for opportunistic networking. His work is highly cited and had a significant impact, making him a clear leader in the area.  In particular, on the conceptual front, he elucidated the connection between social networks and mobile networks. On the empirical side, by measuring human mobility and contact patterns, he laid the foundation for the use of mobility traces as a means for validating models that are widely used for performance evaluation.  His seminal papers published at ACM SIGCOMM workshop 2005  (over 1,350 citations by Jan 2023) and IEEE Transactions on Mobile Computing 2007  (over 2,030 citations by Jan 2023) empirically demonstrated that the human mobility inter-contact time follows a power-law distribution. This finding is crucial for new mobility models as the legacy models usually assumed exponential distribution. The connection of social networks to mobile networks also significantly improve the routing and forwarding efficiency of mobile network, and is considered to be a revolution in routing research in mobile networks.

Mobile Offloading
Professor Hui's work in mobile offloading at Deutsche Telekom has resulted in three practical systems for mobile traffic offloading from cellular networks to both WiFi networks and device-to-device networks and also for computation offloading from smartphones and wearable devices to the cloud and edge servers. His ThinkAir paper on a mobile cloud offloading system  (a result from a Deutsche Telekom innovation development project), with over 1400 citations by Jan 2023, is the most cited paper in IEEE Infocom 2012 conference and the system is now popularly used by the mobile cloud/edge computing community. This line of work demonstrates Prof. Hui's unique ability to combine clear modeling of real-world networking challenges, rigorous analysis, and system implementation.

Metaverse
Professor Hui envisions a perceived virtual universe that is rich in 'Surreality', and is a result of a series of connected, shared, and concurrent 3D virtual spaces that are self-sustaining. Following this vision, he has been leading the Metaverse research that makes global impact on shaping the future of Metaverse development. In terms of technology, his bottom-up approach in Augmented Reality (AR) research has resulted in an open software CloudAR which contains a platform and an SDK to speed up mobile AR development by an order of magnitude. He has also invented many innovative AR/VR applications including augmented driving, gesture control, social interaction, visual privacy protection, and assisted applications for the elderly and the visually impaired. 

He is leading one of the key project at HKUST, 'MetaHKUST', to bring two HKUST campuses (Clear Water Bay and Guangzhou) together and consolidate the real and virtual experience in one platform. MetaHKUST project is receiving international press coverage and highlights the use of metaverse in education and learning industry. One of his research paper, ' All One Needs to Know about Metaverse', has been read over 100,000 times since late 2021.

References 

Fellow Members of the IEEE
Living people
Year of birth missing (living people)
Academic staff of the Hong Kong University of Science and Technology
Academic staff of the University of Helsinki